Akhasan Dam is an irrigation & industrial water dam and embankment dam in Çankırı Province, Turkey. The dam was constructed between 1996 and 2001. The dam is 48 metres high, has a retained water volume of 16,000,000 m³ and covers an irrigation area of 2,253 ha

See also
List of dams and reservoirs in Turkey

References

DSI 

Dams in Çankırı Province
Dams completed in 2001